Michel Granger, born 13 October 1946 in Roanne, is a French visual artist.

His childhood took place in Arsenal County, a period that will strongly mark his artistic work. But encounters and successive travels took him to new horizons and far from his homeland: during the 1970s, his career became international.

Granger is known for his work associated with the musician Jean-Michel Jarre, and particularly with the work Oxygene, depicting a delaminated earth with a semi-exposed skull

References

External links
 

20th-century French painters
20th-century French male artists
21st-century French painters
21st-century French male artists
French stamp designers
People from Roanne
1946 births
Living people